Philip Arnold Smith (April 22, 1952 – July 29, 2002) was an American professional basketball player who played for 9 seasons in the National Basketball Association (NBA) for various teams, including the Golden State Warriors, San Diego Clippers and Seattle SuperSonics. Smith played college basketball for the San Francisco Dons.

Collegiate career 
A 6'4" All-American guard from the University of San Francisco (USF), Smith was not heavily recruited out of George Washington High School. After graduating from high school a semester early, Smith followed his older brother and enrolled in night classes at USF. Having been seen playing in a pickup game on campus, he was recruited by coach Bob Gaillard, who enlisted him on the freshman squad (the NCAA did not allow freshmen to play on varsity at this time) where he averaged 16.7 ppg.  He went on to lead the team in scoring in each of his three varsity seasons, 15.0, 18.7, and 20.7 ppg, for a career average of 18.1 ppg and was an all-West Coast Conference selection all three years. The Dons made appearances in the 1972 NCAA Men's Division I Basketball Tournament placing 4th in the Western Regional after losing to Weber State, and finished in the elite eight in the 1973 NCAA Men's Division I Basketball Tournament and 1974 NCAA Men's Division I Basketball Tournament, where they lost both times to UCLA under John Wooden. As a result, he was drafted #1 in the 1973 ABA draft by the Virginia Squires, but declined leaving college early. He was named to the All-American team his senior year. Scoring 1,523 career points, he excelled at USF becoming the ninth-leading scorer in school history. On February 17, 2001 his number 20 was retired at halftime during a home game against the University of San Diego.  He is one of only five players to have their number retired by USF. He was named one of the Top-50 WCC athletes of all-time in 2001.

Professional career
After his senior year, Smith was selected by the Golden State Warriors with the 11th pick in the 2nd round of the 1974 National Basketball Association (NBA) draft (29th overall), spending six seasons with them. As a rookie during the 1975 season, he averaged 7.7 points on 48 percent shooting in 74 games and was a member of the Golden State Warriors' first NBA championship team. The following year, he stepped into the starting lineup and averaged a career-best 20.0 points while playing in all 82 games. Smith was a two-time NBA All-Star (1976 and 1977), an All-NBA second-team selection in 1976 and a 1976 All-NBA defensive second-team selection. He played for 9 seasons (1974–1983) in the National Basketball Association (NBA), for the Warriors, the San Diego Clippers, and the Seattle SuperSonics. Smith finished his NBA career with 9,924 total points and a 15.1 ppg career average. A ruptured Achilles tendon prior to the start of the 1979–80 campaign caused the decline of his career. He won the NBA championship during his rookie season with the Golden State Warriors.

Personal life 
Was the third of nine children born to Ben and Thelma Smith of San Francisco. He is survived by his wife of 27 years, Angela, and their five children: Alicia, Philip, Amber, Martin and Peter, and 11 grandchildren. Martin played collegiately for the California Golden Bears from 2002–2006; Peter played for his parents' alma mater, the University of San Francisco  before transferring to Concordia University (class of 2012).

September 27 is Phil Smith Day in San Francisco, California as decreed by former Mayor Willie Brown.

A scholarship endowment in Smith's name and the name of Arthur Zief, Jr. was established at the University of San Francisco by Art Zief.

Death 
Philip Smith died at Palomar Medical Center in Escondido, California from complications  with multiple myeloma cancer, after a five-year battle with the disease. He was 50.

NBA career statistics

Regular season 

|-
| style="text-align:left;background:#afe6ba;"| †
| style="text-align:left;"|Golden State
| 74 || – || 14.3 || .476 || – || .804 || 1.9 || 1.8 || 0.8 || 0.0 || 7.7
|-
| style="text-align:left;"| 
| style="text-align:left;"|Golden State
| 82 || – || 34.1 || .477 || – || .788 || 4.6 || 4.4 || 1.3 || 0.2 || 20.0
|-
| style="text-align:left;"| 
| style="text-align:left;"|Golden State
| 82 || – || 35.1 || .479 || – || .785 || 4.0 || 4.0 || 1.2 || 0.4 || 19.0
|-
| style="text-align:left;"| 
| style="text-align:left;"|Golden State
| 82 || – || 35.9 || .472 || – || .812 || 3.7 || 4.8 || 1.3 || 0.3 || 19.7
|-
| style="text-align:left;"| 
| style="text-align:left;"|Golden State
| 59 || – || 38.8 || .501 || – || .761 || 3.6 || 4.4 || 1.7 || 0.4 || 19.9
|-
| style="text-align:left;"| 
| style="text-align:left;"|Golden State
| 51 || – || 30.4 || .474 || .318 || .789 || 2.9 || 3.7 || 1.2 || 0.3 || 15.5
|-
| style="text-align:left;"| 
| style="text-align:left;"|San Diego
| 76 || – || 31.3 || .491 || .222 || .757 || 2.1 || 4.9 || 1.1 || 0.2 || 16.8
|-
| style="text-align:left;"| 
| style="text-align:left;"|San Diego
| 48 || 39 || 30.1 || .440 || .208 || .732 || 2.4 || 4.9 || 0.9 || 0.4 || 13.2
|-
| style="text-align:left;"| 
| style="text-align:left;"|Seattle
| 26 || 2 || 22.9 || .468 || .000 || .727 || 2.7 || 2.8 || 0.8 || 0.3 || 8.2
|-
| style="text-align:left;"| 
| style="text-align:left;"|Seattle
| 79 || 17 || 15.7 || .438 || .375 || .759 || 1.6 || 2.7 || 0.6 || 0.1 || 5.7
|- class="sortbottom"
| style="text-align:center;" colspan="2"| Career
| 659 || 58 || 29.1 || .476 || .253 || .779 || 3.0 || 3.9 || 1.1 || 0.3 || 15.1
|- class="sortbottom"
| style="text-align:center;" colspan="2"| All-Star
| 2 || 0 || 20.0 || .450 || – || .333 || 3.5 || 4.0 || 0.5 || 0.0 || 10.0

Playoffs 

|-
|style="text-align:left;background:#afe6ba;"|1975†
|style="text-align:left;"|Golden State
|16||–||14.7||.375||–||.625||1.8||1.9||0.6||0.4||6.4
|-
|style="text-align:left;"|1976
|style="text-align:left;"|Golden State
|13||–||37.9||.518||–||.734||4.7||4.6||1.6||0.5||24.0
|-
|style="text-align:left;"|1977
|style="text-align:left;"|Golden State
|10||–||37.1||.402||–||.800||5.0||4.5||1.4||0.4||14.2
|-
|style="text-align:left;"|1982
|style="text-align:left;"|Seattle
|8||–||11.5||.400||.000||.333||1.0||0.9||0.6||0.1||3.1
|-
|style="text-align:left;"|1983
|style="text-align:left;"|Seattle
|2||–||9.5||.500||–||–||1.5||0.5||0.0||0.0||3.0
|- class="sortbottom"
| style="text-align:center;" colspan="2"| Career
| 49 || – || 24.7 || .453 || .000 || .719 || 3.1 || 2.9 || 1.0 || 0.4 || 12.0

References 
College Career Statistics
Small Biography
Professional Career Statistics
News Article upon death
Interview with Al Attles about Phil Smith
Article about 1974-1975 championship team
University of San Francisco article on alumni
University of San Francisco article upon death
Dons and Warrior Great Phil Smith Passes Away
Career Stats

1952 births
2002 deaths
20th-century African-American sportspeople
21st-century African-American people
African-American basketball players
American men's basketball players
Basketball players from San Francisco
Deaths from cancer in California
Deaths from multiple myeloma
Golden State Warriors draft picks
Golden State Warriors players
National Basketball Association All-Stars
San Diego Clippers players
San Francisco Dons men's basketball players
Seattle SuperSonics players
Shooting guards
Sportspeople from Escondido, California